Cutler Bay Senior High School is a magnet school and public high school in Cutler Bay, Florida. It is a part of Miami Dade County Public Schools.

History
Cutler Bay Senior High School was originally Centennial Middle School. From 2011-12, the Cutler Bay town council expressed a desire for a high school. Initially, it considered a charter school, but instead decided to persuade the Miami-Dade County School District to establish a district comprehensive high school. 

At the time the community had two middle schools; the district chose to convert Centennial Middle School into a high school. At the time Centennial and the other middle school, Cutler Ridge Middle, had lower than average student populations. What became Cutler Bay High School took territory from Miami Southridge High School, which previously was the zoned school for the town of Cutler Bay. When Cutler Bay decided not to move forward with the charter school, it cut $70,000 from its budget intended for that purpose, which contributed to lowering taxes.

Cutler Bay High opened in August 2012, making it the first high school in the town. Mayor of Cutler Bay Ed MacDougall stated that by having a zoned high school in the town limits, the community would feel invested in Cutler Bay High. The Cutler Bay city council paid for the development of the school through a $2.75 million loan.

Initially Cutler Bay High only had the 9th grade, but it added one grade per year until 2015, and in 2016 its first graduating class had 76 students. Initially the 7th and 8th grades were to remain on the ex-Centennial campus, but they were to be phased out.

Curriculum and academic performance
The school offers three magnet programs; Liberal Arts, iPrep (online-based), and COAST. Students may also opt into the Cambridge Program.

It received an "A" rating from the State of Florida in 2016.

References

External links
 Cutler Bay Senior High School

Miami-Dade County Public Schools high schools
2012 establishments in Florida
Educational institutions established in 2012